Charles De Smedt S.J. (6 April 18334 March 1911) was a Belgian Jesuit priest and hagiographer. He was a Bollandist, and is noted for having introduced critical historical methods into Catholic hagiography, so that it became a collection of accounts of the accretion of legends, as well as the compilation of original materials.

Life
Charles De Smedt was born in Ghent, Belgium on 6 April 1833. He studied at the College of St. Barbara in Ghent, and then at the College of Our Lady of Peace in Namur, continuing his studies at Tronchiennes. He entered the Society of Jesus in 1851.

De Smedt was a professor of literature and mathematics at Tronchiennes; he was ordained in 1862. He became a professor of Church History and of dogmatic theology at Louvain. In 1870 he joined the staff of the Acta Sanctorum in Brussels. He revived the Bollandist Society and founded it scholarly journal, the Analecta Bollandiana in 1882 with G. van Hooff and Joseph de Backer. From 1899 to 1902 De Smedt served as the acting rector at St. Michael's College in Brussels.

He is best known for his contribution to hagiography but also to history and metaphysics. His contribution to the development of a critical approach to History is epitomized in his masterpiece: Principes de la critique historique, which greatly influenced Friedrich von Hügel.

He died in Brussels on 4 March 1911.

Works
Introductio generalis ad historiam ecclesiasticam critice tractandam (1876)
L'Église et la science (1877), early reply to the conflict thesis
Gesta episcoporum Cameracensium, Paris, 1880
Principes de la critique historique, Bruxelles, 1883.

Honors
 Foreign Correspondent of the Académie des Inscriptions et Belles-Lettres, Institut de France
 Foreign Correspondent of the Royal Academy of Madrid
 Honorary member of the Royal Academy of Ireland
 Officer of the Order of Leopold "pro ecclesia et pontifice"

References

External links

1833 births
1911 deaths
19th-century Belgian Jesuits
Christian hagiographers
Contributors to the Catholic Encyclopedia